Kotanarx (also, Ketanarkh and Kotanarkh) is a village and municipality in the Agdash Rayon of Azerbaijan.  It has a population of 1,050.

References

External links

Populated places in Agdash District